Zeng Xianhao (23 October 1898 – 28 August 1969) was a Chinese-born politician better known by the courtesy name Zeng Yangfu. He was a native of Pingyuan County, Guangdong. Zeng served the Nationalist government as Mayor of Guangzhou from 1936 to 1938. He later led the Ministry of Transportation and Communications from 1942 to 1945.

Upon graduation from Peiyang University in 1923, Zeng enrolled at the University of Pittsburgh. Upon his return to China in 1925, Zeng was named to the Kuomintang Central Committee and a political operative of the National Revolutionary Army. Zeng also served as deputy minister of the Agriculture and Mineral Resources. In 1935, Zeng became a member of several government committees on infrastructure. He assumed the mayoralty of Guangzhou between 1936 and 1938, before taking office as transportation and communications minister in 1942. After resigning the office in 1945 due to health reasons, Zeng was elected to the Legislative Yuan in 1948. The next year, he left China for Hong Kong, where he died in 1969.

References

1898 births
1969 deaths
Republic of China politicians from Guangdong
Transportation Ministers of the Republic of China
Mayors of Guangzhou
Members of the 1st Legislative Yuan
Tianjin University alumni
University of Pittsburgh alumni
Hong Kong people of Hakka descent
Politicians from Meizhou